Sergio Morra (1 April 1929 – 3 May 2013) was an Italian field hockey player. He competed in the men's tournament at the 1952 Summer Olympics.

References

External links
 

1929 births
2013 deaths
Italian male field hockey players
Olympic field hockey players of Italy
Field hockey players at the 1952 Summer Olympics
Sportspeople from Genoa